The 2007 Worthing Borough Council election took place on 3 May 2007 to elect members of Worthing Borough Council in West Sussex, England. One third of the council was up for election and the Conservative Party stayed in overall control of the council.

Candidates from the Conservatives, Liberal Democrats, Green Party, Labour and the United Kingdom Independence Party stood in the election. There was also one candidate, Dawn Smith, standing as a "Stop Durrington's Overdevelopment - Save Titnore's Trees" candidate as a protest against plans to build 875 houses near Worthing.

The Liberal Democrats had been hoping to gain three seats, but the results saw the Conservatives gain one seat from the Liberal Democrats to strengthen their majority on the council. The Liberal Democrat defeat came by 12 votes in Selden ward where their candidate James Doyle was upset over the Conservatives using the description "Conservative, Stop Hospital Cuts" on the ballot paper. Conservative Kevin Skepper retained his seat in Broadwater, which he had previously won as a Liberal Democrat before defecting to the Conservatives. This was the first time since 1975 that a Conservative had won in Broadwater. Meanwhile, in Castle ward the Liberal Democrats held both the seats in Castle ward after 3 recounts. Overall voter turnout in the election was 35.41%.

After the election, the composition of the council was:
Conservative 24
Liberal Democrat 12
Independent 1

Election result

Ward results

References

2007 English local elections
2007
2000s in West Sussex